Peter Early (June 20, 1773 – August 15, 1817) was an American lawyer, jurist and politician.

Early life

He was born near Madison in the Colony of Virginia, in 1773, the son of Joel Early and Lucy Smith.  He had a sister Lucy, who later married Charles Lewis Mathews. His cousin, Jubal Early, became the grandfather of Jubal Anderson Early (1816–1894), later a prominent Confederate general.

Peter Early graduated from the Lexington Academy (current-day Washington and Lee University). He later graduated from Princeton College, in 1792. His family moved to Wilkes County, Georgia, on the central eastern border, that same year. Early was studying law with Jared Ingersoll in Philadelphia. After finishing his legal studies, Peter Early joined his family in Wilkes County.

There he married Ann Adams Smith in 1793. In 1796 he began his law practice in Washington, the county seat of Wilkes County.

Political life

Early was elected as a Representative from Georgia to the 8th United States Congress to serve the remainder of the term left vacant by the resignation of John Milledge, who had been elected as Governor of Georgia. Early was re-elected to the 9th Congress. During his congressional service, Early was one of the House managers (prosecutors) in the impeachment trials of John Pickering, New Hampshire United States District Court judge, in January 1804, and Samuel Chase, Associate Justice of the United States Supreme Court, in December of that year. Early did not seek reelection in 1806.

After his congressional service, Early was elected by the Georgia General Assembly as judge of the Superior Court, Ocmulgee Circuit, serving in that court from 1807 until 1813. The respect and popularity he gained from his service on the bench propelled him to be elected the 28th Governor of Georgia in 1813. He served one term, through 1815, during which he was instrumental in committing funds on several occasions from the state treasury to help raise and supply additional troops from Georgia to the American military forces during the latter half of the War of 1812.

Early moved to Greene County after his gubernatorial term, where he was elected to the Georgia Senate.

Death
During his term in the Georgia Senate, Peter Early died on August 15, 1817, at his summer home near Scull Shoals in Greene County. He was buried on the west bank of the Oconee River near his Fontenoy Plantation home, with a simple monument to mark his grave.

In 1914, his family had his remains reinterred in the Greensboro City Cemetery.

Legacy and honors
Early County, Georgia, and Fort Early were named in his honor.

Notes

References

External links
Georgia State Archives Roster of State Governors
Georgia Governor's Gravesites Field Guide (1776-2003)
Governor Peter Early historical marker

1773 births
1817 deaths
Governors of Georgia (U.S. state)
Georgia (U.S. state) state senators
Georgia (U.S. state) state court judges
Washington and Lee University alumni
Princeton University alumni
People from Madison, Virginia
Democratic-Republican Party state governors of the United States
Democratic-Republican Party members of the United States House of Representatives from Georgia (U.S. state)
American slave owners
American lawyers admitted to the practice of law by reading law